Troy Amos-Ross (born July 17, 1975) is a Guyanese-Canadian boxer. As an amateur, he competed in the light heavyweight division at the 1996 Summer Olympics in Atlanta and 2000 Summer Olympics in Sydney, Australia.

Personal life
He is the son of retired boxer Charles Amos who represented Guyana at the 1968 Summer Olympics and first cousin of  Egerton Marcus who won the silver medal for Canada in the Middleweight division at the 1988 Summer Olympics in Seoul, Korea.

Boxing career

In the 1996 Olympics, after having defeated Roland Raforme (Seychelles) and Paul M'Bongo (Cameroon), Ross lost 14–8 in quarterfinals to Kazakhstan's eventual gold medalist Vassili Jirov. Ross entered the 2000 Olympics as a gold medal hopeful, however he was eliminated after a disappointing loss in his first fight with a knockout at the 2nd round by a  Nigerian boxer Jegbefumere Albert

Ross turned pro after the 2000 Summer Olympics, however he announced his retirement in 2005 after compiling a record of 13–1, due to the inability to get quality fights. In 2007 he began a comeback and on March 19, 2007, he captured the Commonwealth Cruiserweight title by knocking out John Keeton in the second round.

The Contender
In 2008 Ross joined the cast of the boxing reality TV show The Contender filming in Singapore.  He became a member of the gold team and on 14 January 2009 won his first round contest against Australian Lawrence Tauasa.  He fought American Felix Cora Jr. in the quarterfinals winning when the fight was stopped after 2:48 of the first round. In the semifinals Troy faced Nigerian Akinyemi Laleye, the fight was scored 50–45 by all three judges in Troy's favor. Troy fought another Nigerian, Ehinomen Ehikhamenor, in the Contender final on February 25, 2009, at the MGM Grand at Foxwoods Casino in Connecticut. Ross defeated Ehikhamenor by fourth-round TKO to become the Contender Champion.

Acting career

Ross has also achieved success out of the ring starting his own fashion line, Ross Wear, and playing roles in movies. He appeared in the 2005 movie Cinderella Man opposite Russell Crowe playing the role of heavyweight boxer John Henry Lewis. Ross also appeared in the 2007 movie Resurrecting the Champ with Josh Hartnett and Samuel L. Jackson, playing the younger version of the champ. He also appears in the movie Phantom Punch, in the role of Heavyweight boxer Floyd Patterson.

Championships and accomplishments
Commonwealth Boxing Council
Commonwealth Cruiserweight Championship (One time)
Canadian Boxing Federation
CBF Cruiserweight Championship (One time)
The Contender
The Contender Season 4 Champion

Professional record

References

External links
 Canadian Olympic Committee
 
 

1975 births
Living people
Light-heavyweight boxers
Cruiserweight boxers
Black Canadian boxers
Boxers at the 1996 Summer Olympics
Boxers at the 1998 Commonwealth Games
Boxers at the 1999 Pan American Games
Boxers at the 2000 Summer Olympics
Boxing people from Ontario
Commonwealth Boxing Council champions
Afro-Guyanese people
Guyanese emigrants to Canada
Naturalized citizens of Canada
Olympic boxers of Canada
Pan American Games bronze medalists for Canada
Commonwealth Games silver medallists for Canada
Sportspeople from Brampton
The Contender (TV series) participants
Sportspeople from Georgetown, Guyana
Canadian male boxers
Commonwealth Games medallists in boxing
Pan American Games medalists in boxing
Medalists at the 1999 Pan American Games
Medallists at the 1998 Commonwealth Games